The 1868 Timaru by-election was a by-election held on 20 November in the  electorate during the 4th New Zealand Parliament.

The by-election was caused by the resignation of the incumbent, Alfred Cox through ill-health. He was replaced by Edward Stafford. As Stafford was the only candidate, he was declared elected unopposed.

References

Timaru 1868
1868 elections in New Zealand
November 1868 events
Politics of Canterbury, New Zealand